The following is a list of county roads in Alachua County, Florida.  All county roads are maintained by the county in which they reside, however not all of them are marked with standard MUTCD approved county road shields.

List of County Roads in Alachua County, Florida

References

General Highway Map; Alachua County, Florida (Florida Department of Transportation)
FDOT GIS data, accessed January 2014
General Highway Map of Alachua County, Florida (March 2022), accessed 28 November 2022

 Alachua
County